The 1995 Taça de Portugal Final was the final match of the 1994–95 Taça de Portugal, the 55th season of the Taça de Portugal, the premier Portuguese football cup competition organized by the Portuguese Football Federation (FPF). It was played on 10 June 1995 at the Estádio Nacional in Oeiras, and opposed two Primeira Liga sides: Marítimo and Sporting CP. Sporting CP defeated Marítimo 2–0 to claim the Taça de Portugal for a twelfth time.

In Portugal, it was televised live on RTP. As a result of Sporting CP winning the Taça de Portugal, the Leões qualified for the 1995 Supertaça Cândido de Oliveira where they took on 1994–95 Primeira Divisão winners Porto.

Match

Details

References

1995
1994–95 in Portuguese football
Sporting CP matches
C.S. Marítimo matches